Lake Norman Charter School is a public charter school in Huntersville, North Carolina. Founded in 1998, it is one of the oldest and largest charter schools in the state.  The high school and middle school are on adjacent campuses near downtown Huntersville, while the elementary school is 3.2 miles away. The school has brought together a diverse variety of students who are admitted through a non-weighted lottery system.

Lake Norman Charter is divided into 3 schools:

Lake Norman Charter has high academic standards and is primarily a college preparatory school. It is a "One-to-One" school, providing laptop computers to each high school student (iPads for middle and elementary school students) and utilizes Schoology, an online system for class submissions and grades.  Lake Norman Charter offers 16 Advanced placement courses and 82% of the students in those classes pass the AP exam.
College enrollment: 96% of the Class of 2017 went on to pursue a post-
secondary degree (78% in 4-year college/university, 18% in 2-year
college/technical school); 3% enlisted in the military or took a gap year.
26% of the Class of 2017 attended colleges and universities outside of
North Carolina.

Lake Norman Charter's (Middle School) math team regularly competes in the AMC 8 (American Mathematics Competition) and  Mathcounts.

Lake Norman Charter's (High School) math team competes in the AMC 10, AMC 12, and various math meets; (Duke, WCU).

The Demographic makeup of the school is Caucasian: 74%, African American: 14%, Asian 4%,
Multi-Racial: 3%, Hispanic: 4%, Native American: 1%, Island Pacific: <1%.

Athletics 
Lake Norman Charter now competes in the NCHSAA 3A level, formerly competing in the 2A level prior to 2021. Lake Norman Charter has state championships in Tennis, Cross Country, and Swimming. Lake Norman Charter's Cheer Team also known as “Charter Cheer” won NCHSAA's 2018 and 2019 State Competition. Lake Norman Charter's Golf Team is one of the most prestigious in the state and won the NCHSAA's 2021 State Competition. Women's Soccer being one of their best sports with the team being back-to-back State Champions in 2A and now 3A.

References

Schools in Mecklenburg County, North Carolina
Charter schools in North Carolina